The 2014 Belgian Super Cup was a football match that was played on 20 July 2014, between 2013–14 Belgian Pro League winners Anderlecht and 2013–14 Belgian Cup winners Lokeren, won by Anderlecht, winning their twelfth super cup.

Anderlecht had played in eighteen previous editions of the Belgian Super Cup, winning in 1985, 1987, 1993, 1995, 2000, 2001, 2006, 2007, 2010, 2012 and their most recent appearance in 2013. Lokeren had played in a Belgian Super Cup once before, two years previous in 2012, also facing Anderlecht and losing 3-2.

Match

Details

See also
2013–14 Belgian Pro League
2013–14 Belgian Cup
2013 Belgian Super Cup

References

2014
Belgian Supercup 2014
Belgian Supercup 2014
Supercup
July 2014 sports events in Europe